Roger Garaudy (17 July 1913 – 13 June 2012) was a French philosopher, French resistance fighter and a communist author. He converted to Islam in 1982. In 1998, he was convicted and fined for Holocaust denial under French law for claiming that the death of six million Jews was a "myth".

Early life and education
Roger Garaudy was born in Marseille to working class  Catholic parents. At the age of 14, Garaudy converted to Protestantism. He fought during World War II and received the Croix de Guerre.  After a period as a Vichy France prisoner of war in Algeria, Garaudy joined the French Resistance working for resistance radio and the newspaper Liberté.

Political career
Garaudy joined the French Communist Party in 1933. By mid 1940s, Garaudy was considered a leading polemicist within the party. He rose through the ranks and in 1945 he became a member of the party's leadership and its Central Executive Committee, where he occupied positions for 28 years.

As a political candidate, he succeeded in being elected to the National Assembly and eventually rose to the position of deputy speaker, and later senator.

Garaudy remained a Christian and eventually re-converted to Catholicism during his political career. Eventually he converted to Islam. He was befriended by one of France's most prominent clerics of the time, the Abbé Pierre, who in later years supported Garaudy, even regarding the latter's most controversial views.

Garaudy was expelled from the Communist Party in 1970, because he had criticized the party's position on the student movement and the Warsaw Pact invasion of Czechoslovakia. His philosophical and political views were characterized as revisionist by Soviet commentators. He had, however, accepted the invasion of Hungary in 1956.

Academic career
He obtained a state doctorate in philosophy in 1953, with a dissertation discussing theory of knowledge and materialism, entitled La théorie matérialiste de la connaissance. In May 1954, Garaudy defended another doctoral thesis, The Problem of Freedom and Necessity in the Light of Marxism, at the Institute of Philosophy, Russian Academy of Sciences.

Garaudy lectured in the faculty of arts department of the University of Clermont-Ferrand from 1962–1965. Due to controversies between Garaudy and Michel Foucault, Garaudy left. He later taught in Poitiers from 1969–1972.

His main research subject was foundations of revolutionary politics.

Political and philosophical views
As of 1940s, Garaudy was critical of Jean-Paul Sartre's view of freedom, maintaining that it lacks any social, economic, political or historical context. He criticized Being and Nothingness for what he deemed not going beyond the domain of metaphysical pathology, and Sartre's novels for "depicting only degenerates and human wrecks" and describing his existentialism as "a sickness".

Garaudy's faith in communism was shaken in 1956, after Nikita Khrushchev made the Secret Speech at the 20th Congress of the Communist Party of the Soviet Union. Afterwards, he espoused an eclectic and humanist view on Marxism, strictly opposing the theoretical Marxism of Louis Althusser and advocating dialogue with other schools of thought.

In 1974, Frederic Will described him as sympathetic towards Pierre Teilhard de Chardin and Gabriel Marcel. He held that the Western culture was something of a coalition between the idealistic philosophy and the elite class, which is devoted to turning man away from the material world. The goal of socialism in his view was not simply economic or providing social justice, but also giving each individual their personal chances for creativity.

Conversion to Islam
Around 1980, Garaudy read The Green Book by Muammar Gaddafi and became interested in Libya and Islam, meeting the country's leader on several occasions in the desert. He converted formally at the Islamic Centre in Geneva, an organisation controlled by the Muslim Brotherhood. Garaudy converted in 1982 after marrying a Palestinian woman, later writing that "The Christ of Paul is not the Jesus of the Bible," and also forming other critical scholarly conclusions regarding the Old and New Testaments. He became an Islamic commentator and supporter of the Palestinian cause.

In The Case of Israel: A Study of Political Zionism (1983), Garaudy portrays Zionism as an isolationist and segregationist ideology that is not only dependent on antisemitism to nourish, but also willfully encourages it to achieve its goals.

Holocaust denial

Conviction of violating Gayssot Act 

In 1996, Garaudy published, with his editor Pierre Guillaume, the work Les Mythes fondateurs de la politique israelienne (literally, The Founding Myths of Israeli Politics), later translated into English as The Founding Myths of Modern Israel. In the book he wrote of "the myth of the six million" Jewish victims of the Holocaust. Because of this breach of French law concerning Holocaust denial, the courts banned any further publication and on 27 February 1998 fined Garaudy 120,000 French francs. He was sentenced to a suspended jail sentence of several years. Garaudy appealed this decision to the European Court of Human Rights, but his appeal was rejected as inadmissible. At his hearing, Garaudy stated that his book in no way condoned National Socialist methods, and that book was an attack on the mythologizing and use of "the holocaust" by Israeli government as policy. He argued that his book dealt with the Israeli government's use of "the holocaust" as a "justifying dogma" for its actions, mainly in Palestine and toward Palestinians.

Garaudy v. France
Garaudy challenged the French ruling and appealed to the European Convention on Human Rights (ECHR), stating that his book was a political work criticizing the policies of Israel that did not deny that the Nazis had committed crimes against humanity, and that his freedom of expression was interfered by the French courts. The ECHR disagreed and ruled that Garaudy has denied historical facts in his book which is not a research work. It also argued that the interference pursued two of the legitimate aims included in Gayssot Act articles and is not a violation of Garaudy's right for free speech. The ECHR did not use this rationale in Perinçek v. Switzerland.

Iranian support
In Iran, 160 members of the parliament and 600 journalists signed a petition in Garaudy's support. On 20 April 1998, Iran's Supreme Leader Ayatollah Ali Khamenei met Garaudy. Khamenei was critical of the West which, he said, condemned "the racist behavior of the Nazis" while accepting the  Zionists’ "Nazi-like behavior." Iranian president, Akbar Hashemi Rafsanjani, insisted in a sermon delivered on Iranian radio that Hitler "only killed 20,000 Jews and not six million" and that "Garaudy's crime derives from the doubt he cast on Zionist propaganda." Iranian President, Mohammad Khatami, described Garaudy in 1998 as "a thinker" and "a believer" who was brought to trial merely for publishing research which was "displeasing to the West."

In December 2006, Garaudy was unable to attend the International Conference to Review the Global Vision of the Holocaust in Tehran, Iran owing to ill health. He reportedly sent a videotaped message supporting Iranian President Mahmoud Ahmadinejad's view that Israel should cease to exist.

Death and legacy
Roger Garaudy died in Chennevières-sur-Marne, Val-de-Marne, on Wednesday 13 June 2012, aged 98.

According to Azzam Tamimi, Tunisian thinker Rached Ghannouchi was inspired by Garaudy in the early 1980s, after he read a translation of his book on women. He subsequently authored a treatise on women rights and on the status of women in the Islamic movement, partly influenced by Garaudy's work.

Awards and honours
 Croix de Guerre
 Médaille de la déportation et de l'internement pour faits de Résistance
 King Faisal International Prize for Services to Islam (1986), jointly with Ahmed Deedat
 Prix Kadhafi des droits de l'homme (2002)

Bibliography

Books by Garaudy
The author of more than 70 books, some his translated works include:
 Literature of the Graveyard: Jean-Paul Sartre, François Mauriac, André Malraux, Arthur Koestler, New York, International Publishers, 1948.
 Marxism and Religion, Australian Left Review, 1949.
 Science and Faith in Teilhard de Chardin, in collaboration with Claude Cuenot, Garnstone Press, 1967.
 Karl Marx: The Evolution of his Thought, International Publishers, 1967, Greenwood Press, 1967, Lawrence & Wishart, 1967.
 From Anathema to Dialogue: The Challenge of Marxist-Christian Cooperation, Collins, 1967.
 From Anathema to Dialogue: A Marxist Challenge to the Christian Churches, Vintage, 1968.
 A Christian-Communist Dialogue: Exploration for Co-operation between a Marxist and a Christian, in collaboration with Quentin Lauer, S.J., New York: Doubleday, 1968.
 Marxism in the Twentieth Century, HarperCollins Distribution Services, 1970, Charles Scribner's Sons, 1970, Collins, 1970.
 The Crisis in Communism: The Turning Point of Socialism, Grove Press, 1970.
 The Turning Point of Socialism, New York: HarperCollins Distribution Services, 1970, London: Fontana, 1970.
 Socialism's Unanswered Questions: Europe 1968, Sydney, Australian Left Review, 1970.
 The Whole Truth, Fontana, 1971.
 The Alternative Future: A Vision of Christian Marxism, Simon & Schuster, 1974.
 God, Marx, and the Future: Dialogue with Roger Garaudy, in collaboration with Russell Bradner Norris, Fortress Press, c. 1974.
 Karl Marx: Evolution of his Thought, Greenwood Press, 1976, Praeger, 1977, ABC-CLIO, 1977.
 The Case of Israel: A Study of Political Zionism, Shorouk International, 1983.
 Mosquée, miroir de l'Islam, The Mosque, Mirror of Islam, Editions du Jaguar, 1985.
 The Founding Myths of Israeli Politics, published by Aaargh, 1996.
 The Mythical Foundations of Israeli Policy, Studies Forum International, 1997.

Books and theses about Garaudy
 André Dupleix, Le Socialisme de Roger Garaudy et le problème religieux, Toulouse: Privat, 1971.
 Michael B. Hughes, The Christian-Marxist Dialogue as Reflected in the Thought of Josef L. Hromadka and Roger Garaudy, M.A. thesis, Kansas State Teachers College of Emporia, 1970
 Charles Joseph McClain, Jr., From Ideology to Utopia: The Marxist Careers of Ernst Fischer and Roger Garaudy, Ph.D. thesis, Stanford University, 1972
 Serge Perottino, Roger Garaudy et le marxisme du XXe siècle, Paris: Seghers, 1969 (Philosophes de tous les temps)
 Michaël Prazan and Adrien Minard, Roger Garaudy, itinéraire d'une négation, Paris: Calmann-Lévy, 2007
 Julian Spencer Roche, Marxism and Christianity: Taking Roger Garaudy's Project Seriously, thesis, Edinburgh Research Archive, University of Edinburgh, 2021

Articles about Garaudy
 Maurice Cranston, "The Thought of Roger Garaudy," Problems of Communism, vol. 19, no. 5 (Sept.-Oct. 1970), pp. 11–18.

See also 
 Robert Faurisson
 Pierre Guillaume

References

External links
 Full text books by Roger Garaudy  on Persée, Ministère de l'Enseignement supérieur, de la Recherche et de l'Innovation
 Roger Garaudy research papers, academia.edu
 Roger Garaudy at French Senate
 Bernard Schmid, Der politisch-ideologische Werdegang des Roger Garaudy. Oder: Die schrittweise Zerstörung der Vernunft (German text)
 Goetz Nordbruch, The Socio-historical Background of Holocaust Denial in Arab Countries: Arab Reactions to Roger Garaudy's The Founding Myths of Israeli Politics, Hebrew University of Jerusalem, 2005
 Julian Spencer Roche, Marxism and Christianity: taking Roger Garaudy’s project seriously, University of Edinburgh, 2021 (Ph.D. thesis)

1913 births
2012 deaths
20th-century French philosophers
21st-century French writers
Anti-Zionism in France
Communist members of the French Resistance
Converts to Protestantism from Catholicism
Converts to Sunni Islam from Protestantism
Deputies of the 1st National Assembly of the French Fourth Republic
Deputies of the 3rd National Assembly of the French Fourth Republic
Former Marxists
French Communist Party politicians
French former Christians
French Holocaust deniers
French male writers
French Muslims
French political philosophers
French prisoners of war in World War II
French Senators of the Fifth Republic
Marxist theorists
Members of the Constituent Assembly of France (1945)
Members of the Constituent Assembly of France (1946)
People convicted of Holocaust denial
Writers from Marseille
Politicians from Marseille
Prix des Deux Magots winners
Recipients of the Croix de Guerre 1939–1945 (France)
Member of the Academy of the Kingdom of Morocco
Senators of Seine (department)
Academic staff of the University of Poitiers
World War II prisoners of war held by Vichy France